The 2000 FIBA Europe Under-20 Championship for Women was the first edition of the FIBA Europe Under-20 Championship for Women. 12 teams featured the competition, held in Bardejov, Lučenec and Ružomberok, in Slovakia, from 28 July to 6 August. The team representing Russia won their first title.

Qualification

Twenty-four national teams entered the qualifying round. They were allocated in five groups. The first two teams of each groups qualified for the tournament, where they joined Spain and Slovakia (qualified as host).

Group A

|}

Group B

|}

Group C

|}

Group D

|}

Group E

|}

Qualified teams

Preliminary round
The twelve teams were allocated in two groups of six teams each.

Group A

Group B

Knockout stage

9th–12th playoffs

Championship

5th–8th playoffs

Final standings

References

FIBA Europe Archive

2000
2000–01 in European women's basketball
2000–01 in Slovak basketball
International women's basketball competitions hosted by Slovakia
International youth basketball competitions hosted by Slovakia
2000 in youth sport